The men's 3000 metres steeplechase  event at the 1952 Summer Olympic Games took place July 23 and July 25.  The final was won by the American Horace Ashenfelter.

Results

Heats
The first round was held on July 23. The four fastest runners from each heat qualified to the final.

Heat 1

Heat 2

Heat 3

Final

Key: WR = World record

References

Athletics at the 1952 Summer Olympics
Steeplechase at the Olympics
Men's events at the 1952 Summer Olympics